Saint-Alban-sur-Limagnole is a commune in the Lozère department in southern France. It is situated in the northern parts of the Lozère department.

See also
Communes of the Lozère department

References

Saintalbansurlimagnole